Premier Cruises was a cruise line holding company formed in the early 1990s that focused on the family cruise market as well as on developing cruise operations in new geographic markets. The company's business focus was to acquire older cruise vessels, refurbish these vessels in order to offer "traditional cruise experiences", operate the vessels in geographic areas, such as Europe and south/Central America, which the major operators such as Carnival Cruise Line, Norwegian Cruise Line and Royal Caribbean International were not focusing at the time, and to market their cruises largely to European and South American customers through strategic marketing partnerships with some of the major tour and travel groups in the world such as Thomson Holidays in the U.K, TUI in Germany, Fritidsresor in Scandinavia, Alpitour in Italy and Pullmantur in Spain (subsequently acquired by Royal Caribbean International for $800 million,) as well as through more than a dozen operators in south / Central America such as CVC in Brazil (which was acquired by the Carlyle Group [63.6%] in January 2010 for $250 million). The company was operating out of its main offices in Cape Canaveral and Miami, Florida.

History 
The company was originally established as Cruise Holdings Ltd. by shipping entrepreneur, Kristian Stensby in the early 1990s which was the entity that later became known as Premier Cruises after Cruise Holdings acquired Premier Cruise Line (and adopted the "Premier Cruises" name) in 1996.

After the acquisition, Premier Cruises consisted of three different operations; i.e.

From the company's inception, Mr. Stensby grew Premier Cruises from one to six ships, operating on itineraries in the United States, Bahamas, South America, the Caribbean and Europe. Mr. Stensby resigned as chairman and chief executive officer of Premier Cruises in the fall of 1997 after growing the company to annualized revenues in excess of $200 million, an operating profit in excess of 20% and more than 3,000 employees, making Premier Cruises, with its 5,500 lower berths, the largest privately-held cruise line in the world at the time.

Post-1997 Premier Cruises (under new ownership and management led by Bruce Nierenberg) changed their business strategies and decided to cancel their marketing agreements with international marketing partners such as Thomson Holidays, Pullmantur and others and decided to reposition a number of their ships back to the United States.
A number of these marketing partners used this opportunity to establish their own cruise operations, such as Pullmantur in Spain who established their own cruise operations (Pullmantur Cruises) after the cancellation of their partnership with Premier Cruises. Pullmantur Cruises, through its parent company, was purchased by Royal Caribbean International in 2006. Thomson Holidays  also used the opportunity to build and expand their cruise operation post 1997 and is now part of the largest travel group in the world TUI.
 
Premier Cruises filed for bankruptcy in late 2000 and ceased operations.

Premier Cruise Line 
Premier Cruise Line was formed in 1983 by two cruise veterans, Bjornar Hermansen and Bruce Nierenberg, under a licensing agreement with the Walt Disney World Resort, and was the direct predecessor to the Disney Cruise Line. In 1992, The Walt Disney Company decided to establish their own cruise line and terminated their licensing agreements with the company. Premier then entered into a similar licensing agreement with Warner Bros. featuring the Looney Tunes characters, in order to maintain its family friendly image. The line continued to operate offering land/sea vacation packages including visits to Disney World and Universal Studios theme parks in Florida.

Some Premier Cruises vessels were still operating until fairly recently, such as the SS Oceanic ("Big Red Boat"), which was sold by Pullmantur (a Royal Caribbean company) in April 2009 to Japan-based Peace Boat, and the SS Rembrandt, formerly known as the SS Rotterdam, was purchased by an investor group in the Netherlands, to be restored and kept as an historic landmark in the city of Rotterdam.

As of 2012, the SS Oceanic was sold for scrap, and the former Starship Majestic, now known as the Ocean Dream, was sailing out of Asia. In 2016, the Ocean Dream, which had changed hands and names multiple times and been abandoned by its owner, capsized and sank off the port of Laem Chabang, Thailand, leaking oil into the Gulf of Thailand.

References 

Defunct cruise lines